The 360 Kickflip, 360 Flip, Tre Flip or 3 Flip is a skateboarding trick invented by Rodney Mullen. This trick is a combination of a 360 pop shove-it and a kickflip. This has become a standard street trick and has also come to be one of the most recognisable. 360 flips are often stylized by catching with the front foot first. This is usually the trick that a lot of people learn after learning all of the basic fundamental flip tricks in skateboarding.

See also
Skateboarding trick

References

Skateboarding tricks